"I Love Me Some Him" is a song by American R&B singer Toni Braxton from her second studio album, Secrets (1996). Written by Andrea Martin and Gloria Stewart and produced by the Danish duo Soulshock & Karlin, the song was released as the flipside to the album's third single, "I Don't Want To", solely in the United States, while international versions of "I Don't Want To" did not include "I Love Me Some Him".

"I Love Me Some Him" was a major R&B airplay hit during the course of 1997, and while there was no music video filmed, it has become one of Braxton's most requested singles. As such, it was included on her 2003 singles collection Ultimate Toni Braxton.

Track listings and formats
U.S. double A-side CD single with "I Don't Want To" / Cassette Single
"I Don't Want To" (Album Version) – 4:17
"I Love Me Some Him" (Album Version) – 5:09

U.S. double A-side CD maxi single with "I Don't Want To"
"I Don't Want To" (Album Version) – 4:17
"I Don't Want To" (Frankie Knuckles Club Mix) – 10:57
"I Don't Want To" (Instrumental) – 4:19
"I Love Me Some Him" (Album Version) – 5:09
"Un-Break My Heart" (Billboard Award Show Version) – 4:12

Charts

Weekly charts

Year-end charts

References

1996 songs
1997 singles
Toni Braxton songs
Songs written by Andrea Martin (musician)
Songs written by Soulshock
Song recordings produced by Soulshock and Karlin
Songs written by Kenneth Karlin
LaFace Records singles
Contemporary R&B ballads
1990s ballads